Szabolcs Szőllősi (born July 31, 1986) is a Hungarian long track speed skater who participates in international competitions.

Personal records

Career highlights

European Allround Championships
2008 - Kolomna,  29th
2009 - Heerenveen, 27th
World Junior Allround Championships
2005 - Seinäjoki, 40th
2006 - Erfurt, 40th
National Championships
2005 - Budapest,  1st at allround
2005 - Budapest,  1st at junior
2005 - Budapest,  3rd at sprint
2006 - Budapest,  1st at allround
2006 - Budapest,  1st at junior
2006 - Budapest,  1st at sprint
2007 - Budapest,  1st at allround
2008 - Budapest,  1st at allround
2008 - Budapest,  1st at sprint

External links
 Szőllősi at Jakub Majerski's Speedskating Database
 Szőllősi at SkateResults.com
 members.chello.hu/bmix.studio/gyorskori

1986 births
Living people
Hungarian male speed skaters